Captain William Sayle (c. 1590–1671) was a prominent British landholder who was Governor of Bermuda in 1643 and again in 1658. As an Independent in religion and politics, and an adherent of Oliver Cromwell, he was dissatisfied with life in Bermuda, and so founded the company of the Eleutheran Adventurers who became the first settlers of the Bahamas between 1646 and 1648. He later became the first governor of colonial South Carolina from 1670 to 1671.

Life in Bermuda

Bermuda, or the "Somers Isles", was settled in 1609 as a result of the wrecking of the Sea Venture, the flagship of the Virginia Company. Although most of the passengers and crew continued to Jamestown, Virginia, the following year on two Bermuda-built ships, the Royal Charter of the company and the boundaries of Virginia were extended to include Bermuda in 1612, when the first governor (at the time, actually the lieutenant-governor) and sixty colonists joined the three men who had remained behind from the Sea Venture. Bermuda's 21 square miles were subdivided into nine parishes (at first called "tribes"). The easternmost, St. George's (where St. George's town was established), was designated "common" or "Crown" land, but the remainder were further subdivided into "shares", each equivalent to a specific share held in the company. The parishes (other than St. George's) were each named for a major shareholder (or "adventurer") in the company. Administration was handed to the crown in 1614, and then in 1615 transferred to a spin-off of the Virginia Company called the Somers Isles Company. The Company appointed a governor, who from 1620 oversaw a House of Assembly that differed from the House of Commons in having no property qualification (due to most land in Bermuda being then owned by absentee landlords). As the House of Assembly consequently governed for the benefit of Bermuda's landless men, a Council made-up of prominent local men appointed by the company was introduced as a combination of upper house and cabinet. This was intended to ensure the balance of power remained with the company, rather than the settlers, but with no other group from which to appoint its members, the council quickly became dominated by men from the same prominent local families that filled the Assembly, and political power rested firmly with this emerging local elite and their descendants until the introduction of universal adult suffrage and party politics in the 1960s.

Although Bermuda quickly became a thriving colony, the growth of tobacco as a cash crop that was the basis of the economy under company administration became unprofitable from the 1620s as Virginia became stable and self-sufficient and England established newer and larger colonies, all of which emulated Bermuda's economy, flooding the English market with cheap tobacco. Few shareholders in the company actually settled in Bermuda, and the land was occupied and worked by tenants and by indentured servants who repaid the cost of their transport to Bermuda with seven years' labour. The more successful settlers (whether they arrived as shareholders or tenants at their own expense or as indentured servants) increased their landholdings by purchasing shares from adventurers who were finding them ever less profitable. Whereas absentee landowners primarily relied on tobacco exports, residents began to switch to maritime trades, replanting the fields that had been cleared from the forest with Bermuda cedar, which was vital to shipbuilding and more valuable than cash crops like tobacco. They also grew food crops and raised livestock for their own consumption, and exported their excess production aboard their new ships for sale in other colonies. This put them at odds with the company, which only earned profits from the tobacco grown for export. This contest between the settlers and the company would end when the settlers took their complaint to the Crown and the company's Royal Charter was revoked in 1684.

Sayle appears to have settled in Bermuda by about 1630. He owned considerable property in the colony, with 165 shares totalling 220.5 acres in Southampton, Smith's, and Pembroke parishes, according to the 1662–1663 survey by Richard Norwood. Among his possessions was the property where the house in Smith's known as Verdmont was built about 1710 off Sayle Road. As one of the colony's most prominent men, he was at times a member of the council (that combined the roles now performed by the Senate and the Cabinet). By this period, the Somers Isles Company had ceased sending new Governors from abroad, and appointed a succession of prominent residents to the position. Sayle was appointed Governor in 1643, but as an Independent Puritan, aligned with the Parliamentary cause, the Commonwealth and then Oliver Cromwell's Protectorship, he was to be at odds with the majority of Bermuda's dominant elite.

The Civil War

In the 1640s, Bermuda was divided by conflict between the episcopal Church of England and Bermuda's revolutionary Independent Puritans and Presbyterians. This was the same as the conflict between Bermudian Royalists and Parliamentarians, as the English Civil War extended into the English colonies. In Bermuda, most of the settlers had already become estranged from the Somers Isles company as those shareholders who had remained in England had barred those who lived in Bermuda from having any say in the management of the company. This meant that, although most land was by then owned by residents like Sayle, their interests were thwarted in order to ensure maximum profits for the shareholders in England. As most of the shareholders in England sided with Parliament when war broke out, most Bermudians saw their interests as aligned with the Crown's.

As the Crown and the Church of England attempted to assert their authorities, similar conflicts took place in other parts of the English realm leading up to the Civil War and the Interregnum, as well as in English-ruled Ireland (where native Irish Catholics and royalists would be suppressed after the 1649–1653 Cromwellian conquest of Ireland, and from where Presbyterian settlers from the Kingdom of England and the Kingdom of Scotland, resenting the Crown's attempts in the 1630s to bring them under Episcopalian authority, had begun to re-emigrate to North America where they became known as Scots-Irish or Scotch-Irish).

In Bermuda, at least, the Royalist–Episcopal forces held sway. After Parliamentary victory in England in 1646, five of the financiers of Sayle's mission to Eleuthera signed the death warrant of King Charles I. However, Bermuda, like Virginia and a handful of other colonies, remained loyal to the Crown. Bermuda was the first to recognise Charles II as King following the 1649 execution of his father. Royalists in Bermuda, with control of "the Army" (nine companies of militia infantry and the volunteer artillery that manned the coastal batteries), ousted Captain Thomas Turner, the Company-appointed Governor, in 1649 and elected John Trimingham as their leader. The Commonwealth barred trade with these colonies, which were singled out by the Rump Parliament in An Act for prohibiting Trade with the Barbadoes, Virginia, Bermuda and Antego, which was passed on 30 October 1650. This stated that due punishment [be] inflicted upon the said Delinquents, do Declare all and every the said persons in Barbada's, Antego, Bermuda's and Virginia, that have contrived, abetted, aided or assisted those horrid Rebellions, or have since willingly joyned with them, to be notorious Robbers and Traitors, and such as by the Law of Nations are not to be permitted any maner of Commerce or Traffique with any people whatsoever; and do forbid to all maner of persons, Foreiners, and others, all maner of Commerce, Traffique and Correspondency whatsoever, to be used or held with the said Rebels in the Barbada's, Bermuda's, Virginia and Antego, or either of them. Parliamentary privateers were authorised to prey on vessels trading with these colonies. The Rump Parliament began amassing forces for the conquests of these colonies before the English colonies in the West Indies were caught up in the Second Anglo-Dutch War. Bermuda would eventually reach a compromise with the London Government which kept the Parliamentary forces out, and preserved the status quo within the colony.

Settlement of the Bahamas

William Sayle established the first English settlement of the Bahamas between 1646 and 1648 on the island of Eleuthera, establishing England's claim to the Bahamas archipelago. He left Bermuda with seventy settlers, mostly Bermudians and some English, who were looking for a place where they could worship God freely. To this end they settled on the Island of Segatoo which they gave the name Eleuthera, from the Greek word meaning freedom. This settlement was planned and authorised from England, and did not result from Bermuda's internal strife. As England's first trans-Atlantic colony to become self-sustaining, Bermuda had been important in supporting the establishment of other English colonies in North America and the west Indies, and the settlement of the Bahamas was to take place from the Bermuda, rather than directly from England. Many of the settlers were, in fact, driven out of Bermuda by intolerance and persecution resulting from the Civil War. In 1644, Bermudian Independent Puritans had sent an expedition to explore the Bahamas, but one vessel was lost and the other failed to find a suitable island.

The exact dates and circumstances of Sayle's voyage are uncertain. Some sources say that Sayle first left Bermuda in 1646, however, Sayle and his Eleutheran Adventurers did not agree on their "Articles and Orders of Incorporation" until 9 July 1647. Perhaps Sayle made at least two voyages, for in a letter of March 1646, William Rener of Bermuda writes to John Winthrop of Massachusetts to report that of two ships recently sailed to the Bahamas, one had been lost and one returned to Bermuda without having found the Bahamas. Rener also mentions that he and Sayle had purchased half interest in a ship, the William, for the purpose of sailing to the Bahamas. In any case, Sayle took seventy people to settle at some point between spring 1646 and autumn 1648. The victorious Royalist Government of Bermuda subsequently ordered two other Cromwellian ministers, and sixty of their followers, to emigrate to the Bahamas.

Sayle's legal claim to proprietorship in the Bahamas now seems questionable. In 1646, Sayle, then of Bermuda, claimed to have a grant from the English Parliament to the island of Sagatos, Bahamas, but no record of this grant can be found in The Journal of the House of Commons. However, on 31 August 1649 The Journal does record that "An Act for Settling the Islands in the West Indies betwixt the Degrees of Twenty-four and Twenty-nine North Latitude was passed." Though the Act does not mention William Sayle specifically, a letter from lawyer John Bolles dated 15 August 1654 refers to an act passed in 1650 "for encouragement of adventurers to some newly discovered Islands", and Bolles mentions "William Saile" as one of the twenty-six proprietors. Authorisation, then, may have come after the fact. Sayles was the only one of the twenty-six proprietors to settle in the Bahamas, and he tried to exercise propriety rights over the island much of his life.

The difficulties of frontier life and of internal conflicts were not fertile ground for a democracy. On the voyage to the Bahamas, a Captain Butler, one of the settlers from England, rebelled against the Articles and caused such trouble in the new settlement that William Sayle left the original settlement in north Eleuthera for the nearby island of St. George's Cay, now known as Spanish Wells.

In 1657, Sayle returned to Bermuda, and in 1658, he was re-appointed Governor (he was first appointed Deputy Governor and Captain General on 30 June), a position he lost in 1662, when he was appointed to the Council of Bermuda.

Articles and orders of 1647
The Articles that Sayle drew up in 1647 reflect the ambiguities of the English Civil War taking place at that time between Royalists and Parliamentarians. Therefore, while the preamble refers to the "Raign of our Soveraign Lord Charles, by the Grace of God, King of England, Scotland, France, and Ireland; Defender of the Faith, &c", the articles themselves make clear that the new settlement was to be effectively independent, making no further mention of royal authority. On the contrary, they concern the rules governing the "Members of the Republick" and the "Magistracie or officers of the Republicke". The articles established freedom of religion and opinion, three hundred acres of land per settler, governance under a governor and twelve councillors chosen from a senate composed of the first 100 settlers, and humane treatment of any indigenous people still on the island. It has been noted that if Sayle's settlement had been successful, then he would have created in the Bahamas "the first democratic state in the New World," some 130 years before the American Revolution.

Governor of Carolina Colony
In 1669, Sayle took over the command of a party of settlers to a new settlement in Carolina after Sir John Yeamans resigned, while undergoing repairs of his vessel in Bermuda. He arrived in South Carolina aboard a Bermuda sloop with a number of Bermudian families, and founded the town of Charleston. In 1670, William Sayle, then in his eighties, became the first Colonial Governor of the colony of Carolina (in 1669, Carolina would be split into two provinces, and in 1712 the southern Clarendon province, that included Charleston, became South Carolina while the Albemarle province became North Carolina). Sayles was also instrumental in encouraging the Lords Proprietors to successfully apply for a grant of The Bahama Islands in 1670. He died in 1671.

Notes

Sources
Bethell, A. Talbot. Early Settlers of the Bahamas and Colonists of North America, 1937. Westminster, MD: Heritage Books, Inc., (2008) Reprint.
Jarvis, Michael The Exodus, in The Bermudian magazine, June 2001.
Riley, Sandra. Homeward Bound: A History of the Bahama Islands to 1850 with a Definitive Study of Abaco in the American Loyalist Plantation Period. Miami, Florida: Riley Hall Publishers, 2000. Print.

External links
Website on Carolina Governors
Articles and orders of 1647 of the Eleutheran Adventurers 
Bermuda online

History of Bermuda
Governors of Bermuda
Colonial governors of South Carolina
British colonial heads of the Bahamas
Year of birth uncertain
Year of death missing
1590 births
Republicanism in the Bahamas
Republicanism in Bermuda